Trend Is Dead! Records (stylized tREND iS dEAD! records) is an independent record label in Normal, Illinois. The label was founded in 1995 and released titles on cassette and vinyl before switching to compact discs.

Trend Is Dead! is recognized for its punk releases, although some have delved into experimental, rock, garage, industrial, and hardcore. The label has released material by  Frantics, Dee Dee Ramone, Dade County Resistance, Black Left Pinky, Santa's Dead, Youth Gone Mad, and Sonny Vincent and the Bad Reactions.

Compilation albums
After some success pressing small runs of tapes of local artists, Trend Is Dead! Records began issuing ten band compilation cassettes involving bands from the Blo/No scene, alongside other groups from across the United States. The first CD released by Trend Is Dead! Records was the Trendy Compilation in 1998.

 tREND iS dEAD! Volume One (1996)
 tREND iS dEAD! Volume Two (1997)
 tREND iS dEAD! Volume Three (1998)
 Trendy Compilation (1998)
 Worse Than Alternative It's Another PUNK COMP (1999)
 Ramones Maniacs (tribute, 2001)
 ¿dEAD iS tREND? Sampler (2005)

Artists

 Black Left Pinky
 Brothers Boch
 Cletus
 Courtney Ono
 Dade County Resistance
 Dee Dee Ramone
 End Me
 Frantics
 Love Camp 7
 OPIUM
 Pee Pee Touchers
 The Pull-Outs
 Sonny Vincent
 t.r. (Totally Ridiculous)
 Youth Gone Mad

See also 
 List of record labels

External links
 Official site

Record labels established in 1995
American independent record labels
Punk record labels
Companies based in Bloomington–Normal
American companies established in 1995
1995 establishments in Illinois